Yager Creek is a tributary stream of the Van Duzen River on the north coast of California in Humboldt County, California.  It has its source at the confluence of  North Fork Yager Creek and Middle Fork Yager Creek.  Its mouth is at the confluence with the Van Duzen River just below the town of Carlotta.

References

Rivers of Humboldt County, California
Rivers of Northern California
Tributaries of the Eel River (California)